Ihlea is a genus of tunicates belonging to the family Salpidae.

The species of this genus are found in America, Australia, Antarctica.

Species:

Ihlea magalhanica 
Ihlea punctata 
Ihlea racovitzai

References

Tunicates